is a Japanese professional footballer who plays as a forward for Zweigen Kanazawa.

References

External links

1997 births
Living people
Japanese footballers
Association football forwards
Zweigen Kanazawa players
J2 League players